Clearwater is an unincorporated community in Saline Township in Sainte Genevieve County, Missouri, United States. It is located approximately fifteen miles southwest of Sainte Genevieve on Missouri Supplemental Route W.

History
Clearwater was named by the town's first postmaster, J. C. Nations, for Clearwater, Florida, where his cousin lived. The town on the west coast of Florida, near Tampa, is now known as Clearwater Harbor.

A post office was established at Clearwater in 1929, and remained in operation until 1981.

References

Unincorporated communities in Ste. Genevieve County, Missouri
Unincorporated communities in Missouri